LankaBangla Finance Limited is a licensed non-banking financial company in Bangladesh. Mohammad A. Moyeen is the chairman of LankaBangla Finance Limited. Khwaja Shahriar is the CEO and managing director of LankaBangla Finance Limited.

History 
LankaBangla Finance Limited was established in 1997 as a non-banking financial institution by Vanik Incorporation Limited of Sri Lanka and some Bangladeshi investors. It was originally named Vanik Bangladesh Limited but was renamed to LankaBangla Finance Limited in 2003. Sampath Bank and One Bank Limited purchased shares in 2003.

In 2005, LankaBangla Finance Limited launched LankaBangla Finance MasterCard replacing the old Vanik Card which was launched in 1998. In May 2007, it provided a 10 per cent cash dividend.

In 2010, the company was planning to go public with LankaBangla Securities Limited. Mohammed Nasir Uddin Chowdhury was appointed managing director of LankaBangla Finance Limited on 4 December 2011.

On 1 June 2017, Khwaja Shahriar was appointed managing director of LankaBangla Finance Limited.

LankaBangla Finance Limited increased their profit by 14.35 per cent in 2019 despite the liquidity crises in the financial market of Bangladesh. It received US$20 million from the Islamic Corporation for the Development of the Private Sector. In June 2020, it declared a 12 per cent dividend.

In 2022, LankaBangla Finance Limited signed memorandum of understanding with Rangs Limited. It signed an agreement with Nagad in June. LankaBangla Securities was the top stock broker for 16 years at Dhaka Stock Exchange and 15 years at the Chittagong Stock Exchange consecutively. LankaBangla Securities Limited thanked chairman of Bangladesh Securities and Exchange Commission Shibli Rubayat-Ul-Islam for approving TradeXpress of LankaBangla, a broker hosted OMS. It had 4.35 billion BDT in classified loans in 2022. Government Pension Fund of Norway invested US$1.76 million in LankaBangla Finance.

In 2023, LankaBangla Finance Limited signed an agreement with Trust Axiata Pay (TAP).

Subsidiaries 

 LankaBangla Securities Limited
 LankaBangla Investments
 LankaBangla Asset Management Company
 LankaBangla Foundation

Board of Directors

References 

Organisations based in Dhaka
Bangladeshi companies established in 1997
Financial services companies of Bangladesh